Schwarzenberg Castle was based on a medieval fortification and together with St. George's Church dominates the scene of the large county town of  Schwarzenberg in Saxony's district of Erzgebirgskreis.

Construction history
The castle was probably founded in the 12th century as a fort and was the original base for the settlement of Schwarzenberg and its vicinity. The former castle was given its present appearance by a conversion into a hunting lodge for the Electorate of Saxony from 1555 to 1558. In 1851/52 its keep and south wing were raised and, in 1875/76, an office building extension was added.

Sources 

 Georg Dehio: Handbuch der Deutschen Kunstdenkmäler Sachsen: II. Regierungsbezirke Leipzig und Chemnitz. Deutscher Kunstverlag, München 1998, S. 908.
 Walter Fröbe: Herrschaft und Stadt Schwarzenberg bis zum 16. Jahrhundert, Schwarzenberg: Geschichtsverein, 1930/37.
 Hans Becher: Schloss Schwarzenberg: Baugeschichte, Ereignisse, Museum Erzgebirgisches Eisen und Zinn Schwarzenberg, 1984
 Götz Altmann: Damit es in alter Schönheit erstrahlt - Zur Rekonstruktion und Restaurierung des Schlosses Schwarzenberg. In: Erzgebirgische Heimatblätter 3/1980, S. 66–67,

References 

Museums in Saxony
Castles in Saxony
Museums in the Ore Mountains
Schwarzenberg, Saxony
Buildings and structures in Erzgebirgskreis